Vencer el pasado (stylized Vencer el p@sado; English: Overcoming the Past) is a Mexican telenovela that aired on Las Estrellas from 12 July 2021 to 5 November 2021. The series is produced by Rosy Ocampo. The series is the third production of the "Vencer" franchise. The series deals with many issues such as digital bullying, abuse of social media, and abortion. It stars an ensemble cast lead by Angelique Boyer, Sebastián Rulli, Erika Buenfil, Africa Zavala, Manuel "Flaco" Ibáñez, Leticia Perdigón, Ferdinando Valencia, and Horacio Pancheri.

Plot 
The series follows four women who try to overcome misfortunes. Realizing that what is posted on social media is never erased, they must find a solution to live in the present and focus on a positive future if they want to overcome past obstacles.

Cast 
 Angelique Boyer as Renata Sánchez Vidal
 Sebastián Rulli as Mauro Álvarez
 Erika Buenfil as Carmen Medina
 Africa Zavala as Fabiola Mascaró
 Manuel "Flaco" Ibáñez as Camilo Sánchez
 Leticia Perdigón as Sonia Vidal
 Ferdinando Valencia as Javier Mascaró
 Horacio Pancheri as Alonso Cancino
 Otto Sirgo as Eusébio Valencia
 Dacia González
 Arantza Ruiz as Mariluz Blanco
 Roberto Blandón as Heriberto Cruz Núñez
 Beatriz Moreno as Doña Efigenia "Efi" Cruz
 Cynthia Alesco as Ana Solís
 Arena Ibarra as Natalia
 Luis Curiel as Rodrigo Valencia
 Miguel Martínez as Erik Sánchez Vidal
 Sebastián Poza as Ulises Cruz Medina
 Iván Bronstein as Isidro Roca Benavides
 Alberto Lomnitz as Arturo
 Andrés Vásquez as Dimitri "Dimi"
 Ana Paula Martínez as Danna Cruz Medina
 André de Regil as Oliver Cruz Medina
 André Real
 Camila Nuñez
 Carlos Bonavides as Father Antero
 Gabriela Núñez as Zoila
 Ignacio Guadalupe as Gaudencio
 Andrea Locord as Norma
 Elías Toscano as Benito
 Cruz Rendel as Eleazar Tolentino
 Fer Manzano Moctezuma as José
 Ricardo Manuel Gómez
 Leonardo Daniel as Lisandro Mascaró
 Diego Olivera as Lucio Tinoco
 María Perroni as Rita Lozano

Guest stars 
 Claudia Álvarez as Ariadna López Hernández
 Matías Novoa as Claudio Fonssetti
 Gabriela Rivero as Brenda Zermeño Carranza
 Valentina Buzzurro as Gemma Corona
 Jade Fraser as Cristina Durán

Production 
The telenovela was announced on 12 January 2021. Production began on 8 April 2021, and ended on 28 August 2021.

Episodes

Reception

Ratings 
 
}}

Awards and nominations

Notes

References

External links 

2021 telenovelas
2021 Mexican television series debuts
2021 Mexican television series endings
2020s Mexican television series
Televisa telenovelas
Mexican telenovelas
Spanish-language telenovelas
Television series about social media
Mexican LGBT-related television shows